Emperor Philip may refer to:

 Philip I (Roman emperor) (204–249; Philip the Arab), Caesar, Emperor of the Roman Empire
 Philip II (Roman emperor) (237–249; Philip the Younger), Caesar, Emperor of the Roman Empire
 Philip I, Latin Emperor (1243–1283), Emperor of the Latin Empire of Constantinople
 Philip II, Latin Emperor (1278–1331), Emperor of the Latin Empire of Constantinople
 Philip III, Latin Emperor (1329–1374), Emperor of the Latin Empire of Constantinople

See also

 King Philip (disambiguation)
 Prince Philip (disambiguation)
 Philip (disambiguation)
 Philip (name)
 Philippikos Bardanes (died 713), Emperor of the Byzantine Empire